The Tinui River is a river of the Wellington Region of New Zealand's North Island. It flows initially east from its origins in the northern Wairarapa before turning southwest to flow parallel with the Pacific coast.

See also
List of rivers of New Zealand

References
 

Rivers of the Wellington Region
Rivers of New Zealand